Sedgefield Racecourse is an English left-handed horse racing course, used for jump racing. It is owned by Arena Racing Company and located close to the town of Sedgefield, County Durham.

The finishing straight is about three furlongs in length, with a steep descent followed by a climb to the winning post after the last fence. It is also used as a venue for numerous other indoor and outdoor events, such as weddings and conferences. The course was almost shut down three times in the 20th century.

History

Racing has been taking place at Sedgefield since at least 1732, but little is known of these early meetings. In 1804 Ralph Lambton, an ancestor of the Earls of Durham, formed a club based at the Hardwick Arms and Sedgefield became the headquarters of the Ralph Lambton Hunt.  Among the original members of the club were Ralph Brandling, then owner of  Gosforth Park and Robert Surtees, the father of Robert Smith Surtees, the author of Jorrocks. The Sedgefield course was part of the Sands Hall Estate, home of the Ord family and once known as the Melton of the North.  Racing may not have been staged every year and it was not until 1846 that officially recognised meetings were held.

Until World War I the Sedgefield Hunt staged an annual two-day fixture in March. When racing resumed the number of meetings soon increased to three, including a lucrative Bank Holiday fixture.  A new Racecourse Company was founded in 1927, and has seen the fixtures gradually increase to the current level.

Facilities only improved slowly, and in the 1960s Clement Freud famously described the course as “all field and not much sedge”.  When Frank Scotto was appointed as chairman in 1977 following the death of Harry Lane the course was rumoured to be on the verge of closure.  He instigated a series of improvements, replacing primitive tin huts with new bars and eating areas, building the new Sedgefield Pavilion in 1991 and the Theakston Suite in 1995, while increasing the number of corporate hospitality suites.  Stable facilities were improved, not only for the horses, but for the stable staff, jockeys, owners and trainers.  After Scotto's death in 1996 the course’s future was uncertain, though a state-of-the-art Weighing Room Complex was constructed in 1998, with better facilities for jockeys, officials and medical staff. In 1999, the future of the course was questioned after a horrific incident in a novices' chase. Three horses were killed after three riderless horses ran into the remainder of the field after running up the chase track the wrong way. The racecourse had just narrowly avoided closure for the third time that century.  The purchase of the course by Northern Racing was completed in 2001.  Since then they have invested around £600,000 on the racecourse, notably on a refurbished Parade Ring/Winners Enclosure, upgraded bars and eating areas and improvements to the course's drainage system.

For many years the run from the last fence to the winning post was 525 yards, even longer than the run-in on the Grand National course.  This was because the obstacle nearest the finishing line was a water jump, which cannot be the first or last fence in a race.  In 1994 it was replaced by an ordinary plain fence, and it is now jumped on the final circuit, making a run-in of conventional length.  It is known as the Johnny Ridley fence as a result of the local bookmaker’s long sponsorship of it.

Notable races
The Durham National is a steeplechase run at an October meeting over the unusual distance of three and three quarter miles. One of the most popular winners in recent years was Fatehalkhair, a cast-off from one of the major flat race stables, who went on to win twenty races.  Thirteen of them were over jumps, and they were all at Sedgefield.

Local businessman and racehorse owner John Wade sponsored a series of selling hurdle races throughout the season at Sedgefield for a number of years, which in 2010 was upgraded to a series of novices' hurdles culminating in a final on the same night as the Durham National.

References

External links
Sedgefield Racecourse (Official website)
Course guide on GG.COM
Course guide on At The Races

Horse racing venues in England
Sports venues in County Durham
Sports venues completed in 1927